The Sacramento Valley Electric Railroad was a short-lived electric interurban railway in the U.S. state of California. It began operation on October 10, 1914, and ran for 11.8 miles between Dixon and Rio Junction (or Dixon Junction). The line was run by the Oakland, Antioch, & Eastern Railway, and was abandoned on August 9, 1917, after decreasing revenue.

History 
The railway was incorporated on May 4, 1912, by Melville Dozier Jr to construct a railway line between Redding and Rio Junction (The Oakland, Antioch, & Eastern Railway interchange), via Dixon, Woodland, Marysville, Colusa, Hamilton City, and Red Bluff. Construction began somewhere around 1913 after surveying was completed between Red Bluff and Rio Junction for the Sacramento Valley West Side Electric Railway, who later reorganized into the Sacramento Valley Electric Railroad after failed attempts to encourage investment. Originally, the line would have interchanged with the Vallejo & Northern (who intended to build a line between Napa and Sacramento) at Dixon. Equipment and tracks was provided by the Oakland, Antioch, & Eastern Railway, who held a large share in the Sacramento Valley Electric Railroad's shares.

Of the planned 193 mile long route, only 11.8 miles were built between Rio Junction (later renamed Olcott) and Dixon. The Sacramento Valley Electric Railroad leased the service to the Oakland, Antioch, & Eastern Railway, and gave forth portions of their monthly revenue to the other line. The railway began service on October 10, 1914, with the first official train being led by company officials. From the start, the line was unprofitable as it traversed flat unpopulated land. Between March 1 and June 8, 1915, there were only 56 passengers recorded who actually travelled the line. Operating expenses were quite high, while revenue was very low.

The Oakland, Antioch, & Eastern Railway applied to the Railroad Commission to abandon the line on July 23, 1917. It last ran on August 9, before it was torn up and partially salvaged by the Tidewater Southern Railway for its electrified line.

The station agent at Dixon regularly had to send mail reminding Oakland, Antioch, & Eastern officials to pay him, as the company often avoided this due to the unprofitable nature of the line.

References 

Defunct California railroads
Interurban railways in California
Railway companies established in 1915
Railway companies disestablished in 1917
American companies established in 1915
1915 establishments in California
1917 disestablishments in California